Country House Rescue is an observational documentary series which airs on British terrestrial television channel, Channel 4. The series has also aired on BBC Canada, ABC1 in Australia and Living in New Zealand and in South Africa.

In each episode, an expert visits a struggling country house and tries to turn its fortunes by giving advice and suggestions to the owner/s. The first three series saw Ruth Watson in this role. The fourth series, airing from June 2012, saw Simon Davis take the role.

The series premiered on 9 December 2008, and gained audiences of up to 2.7 million on its first run. In March 2009, it was reported that a second series of Country House Rescue featuring Ruth Watson had been commissioned by Channel 4, to be filmed in HD. The second series was originally planned to return for an extended 14-episode run, in early 2010, however three episodes (all revisits of houses previously featured) were brought forward, and aired during November and December 2009 as a mini-series. The second series of new episodes aired throughout Spring 2010, and the third series aired throughout Spring 2011. From August 2011, a further series of revisits of houses previously featured aired, though the series began with a previously unaired episode from series two. However, Watson stated on her own website that she would not present any more series of Country House Rescue in the future. In November 2011, Channel 4 announced that Simon Davis would present the 4th series to be broadcast in Spring 2012.

The series is narrated by Hugh Bonneville.

Episodes

Series 1 (2008–09)

Country House Rescue Revisited (2009)

Series 2 (2010)

Series 3 (2011)

Country House Rescue Revisited (2011)

Series 4 (2012)

References

External links

Country House Rescue at YouTube

Channel 4 documentary series
2008 British television series debuts
2012 British television series endings
2010s British television series
Country houses in the United Kingdom
English-language television shows
Television series by All3Media